The 20th New Zealand Parliament was a term of the New Zealand Parliament. It was elected at the 1919 general election in December of that year.

1919 general election

The 1919 general election was held on Tuesday, 16 December in the Māori electorates and on Wednesday, 17 December in the general electorates, respectively.  A total of 80 MPs were elected; 45 represented North Island electorates, 31 represented South Island electorates, and the remaining four represented Māori electorates.  683,420 voters were enrolled and the official turnout at the election was 80.5%.

Sessions
The 20th Parliament sat for four sessions (there were two sessions in 1921), and was prorogued on 30 November 1922.

Party standings

Start of Parliament

End of Parliament

Ministries
The wartime coalition between the Reform Party and the Liberal Party had come to an end by August 1919. William Massey of the Reform Party had been the leader of the coalition, with Joseph Ward of the Liberal Party as the deputy.  Ward left the coalition because it had become deeply unpopular with the population.  Massey then formed the second Massey Ministry on 25 August 1919 and remained in power during the term of the 20th Parliament and beyond until his death on 10 May 1925.

Initial composition of the 20th Parliament

By-elections during 20th Parliament
There were a number of changes during the term of the 20th Parliament.

Notes

References

20